The Michigan State University College of Nursing is the nursing college at Michigan State University. It is located on the southeastern side of campus in East Lansing, Michigan, United States.  The college is centered in the Life Sciences Building, adjacent to the College of Human Medicine. The  dean of the school is Randolph F. R. Rasch, PhD, RN, FAANP. The College of Nursing is among the top 100 graduate nursing programs in the country, ranking at #36 in the nation according to U.S. News & World Report. The College of Nursing at Michigan State University offers a professional student environment that fosters professional and personal development of pre-nursing and nursing students. The College shares the university's research, compassion, and high-achieving educational goals. The College provides several options to become a nurse or advance your nursing education. Those include: BSN Pathways (Traditional, Accelerated Second Degree, and Registered Nurses), MSN Concentrations (Nurse Practitioner, Clinical Nurse Specialist with Nurse Education, and Nurse Anesthesia), DNP program, PhD program and Continuing Education. 
According to the College of Nursing's website, “80 faculty members represent a diverse blend of leading scholars and distinguished healthcare professionals who bring real world experience to the classroom. They conduct research that helps students graduate with confidence of moving forward with careers.”
As a part of their role in the College of Nursing, faculty maintains a clinical practice. According to the Faculty Practice page, the clinic believes “teaching research, practice and service must be closely integrated to achieve excellence. It is also backed by the research of MSU, education programs of the College and Michigan State University Health Team.”

The College of Nursing also offers professional partnerships to deliver community care that improves health outcomes. The College believes utilizing partnerships with numerous individual nurses, healthcare organizations, and institutions increases the skills of nursing professionals and positively impact the growing healthcare system.

According to Michigan State University College of Nursing, offering Academic Instructional Support Services (AISS) provides teaching and learning support for faculty and students involved in onsite, offsite, and distance education programs. There are five technology classrooms located on the first floor of the Life Sciences and Bott Building for nursing education and research. These classrooms include a combination of audio, visual, and computing equipment. The Bott Building supports the College's growth as a national research leader and will help the state address its nursing shortage. The three-story, 50,000-square-foot building has two of three floors that are devoted to nursing research and doctoral studies. The second and third floors provides space for PhD students and College of Nursing researchers to conduct research and host seminars.

Following a grant received by Montana State University, children on the Blackfeet Nation will be able to access dental treatment and wellness screenings. According to MSU, a $50,000 grant from the Otto Bremer Trust will enable them and their partners to offer programs and screenings to approximately 400 children on the Blackfeet Reservation in 2021.

See also
List of nursing schools in the United States

References

External links
Michigan State University College of Nursing

College of Nursing
Nursing schools in Michigan
Educational institutions established in 1950
1950 establishments in Michigan